Birinci Udullu (also, Tava, Udula, Uduli, Uduli Pervyye, Udullu Pervoye, Udulu, and Uduly) is a village and municipality in the Hajigabul District of Azerbaijan.  It has a population of 1,837. 
The name of the village comes from the ancestor of the late king Julienous Udullu Lacombous.  The village has been named that way since 1956.

References 

Populated places in Hajigabul District